Radka Bobková (born 12 February 1973) is a former Czech professional tennis player.

Bobková has a career-high WTA singles ranking of 47, achieved on 20 September 1993. She also has a best doubles ranking of 59, reached on 14 August 1995. She won two singles titles and two doubles titles on the WTA Tour.

Bobková retired from professional tennis 2001.

WTA career finals

Singles: 2 (2 titles)

Doubles: 4 (2 titles, 2 runner-ups)

ITF finals

Singles (5–3)

Doubles (5–6)

External links
 
 

Living people
Czech female tennis players
Tennis players from Prague
1973 births
Czechoslovak female tennis players